Raising the Flag at Ground Zero is a photograph by Thomas E. Franklin of The Record newspaper of Bergen County, New Jersey, taken on September 11, 2001. The picture shows three New York City firefighters raising the U.S. flag at Ground Zero of the World Trade Center, following the September 11 attacks. The official names for the photograph used by The Record are Firefighters Raising Flag and Firemen Raising the Flag at Ground Zero. The photo appeared on The Record front page on September 12, 2001. The paper also put it on the Associated Press wire and it appeared on the covers of several newspapers around the world. It has often been compared to the Raising the Flag on Iwo Jima photograph taken by Joe Rosenthal during World War II.

Photograph
Franklin shot the photograph shortly after 5 p.m. with a telephoto lens. At this time, he was standing under a pedestrian walkway across the West Side Highway that connected the center to the World Financial Center, located at the northwest corner of the World Trade Center site.

Franklin had hitched a ride on a tugboat across the Hudson River, arriving around noon after the towers had collapsed.  He was with photographer James Nachtwey when he saw the firefighters.

The firefighters pictured were Brooklyn-based firefighters George Johnson of Rockaway Beach, Dan McWilliams of Long Island (both from Ladder 157), and Billy Eisengrein of Staten Island (Rescue 2).

Flag
The flag came from the yacht Star of America, owned by Shirley Dreifus and her late husband Spiros E. Kopelakis, which was docked in the yacht basin in the Hudson River at the World Financial Center. McWilliams cut the yardarm off of the yacht with a K12 Saw and then took the flag and its pole from the yacht to an evacuation area on the northwest side of the site.

Soon after its raising above Ground Zero, the flag disappeared. The city thought it had possession of the flag after the attack; Mayor Rudolph Giuliani and George Pataki signed it, and it flew at the New York City Hall, Yankee Stadium and on the  during its service in the Mideast. 

However, when the flag's owner prepared to formally donate the flag, it was discovered that it was not the flag from Ground Zero. There was a size discrepancy: the yacht's flag measured , while the flag the city had measured . Dreifus started a website in an effort to get the flag back. A 2013 CNN documentary film, The Flag, directed by filmmakers Michael Tucker and Petra Epperlein, investigated the mystery of this missing 9/11 icon and discovered video evidence that the flag went missing hours after it was first raised. 

The original flag has now been recovered. The recovery came as a result of a lead gathered following the airing of the History Channel's Brad Meltzer's Lost History in 2014. A number of scientists have now verified that the flag is authentic, and it was unveiled on Sunday, September 11, 2016, the 15th anniversary of 9/11, on a History Channel special on the flag, America's 9/11 Flag: Rise From the Ashes.

Later use

Michael Kessel, a Manhattan attorney, suggested to U.S. Representative Gary Ackerman that the photo be used for a stamp, and the "Heroes 2001" stamp, USA Scott #B2, was unveiled on March 11, 2002, by President George W. Bush, in a ceremony attended by Franklin, Johnson, Eisengrein, and McWilliams. These stamps were semipostals: they had a purchase price (45¢) higher than their postage value (34¢), with the balance given to the Federal Emergency Management Agency's relief efforts. A special exception was thus made to the normal requirement by the United States Postal Service that subjects of stamps be deceased. 

In December 2001, the New York City Fire Department unveiled plans for a statue based on the photograph to be placed at the Brooklyn headquarters.  In an effort to be inclusive of all those who had been affected by the tragedy, the statue was to include black, white, and Hispanic firefighters. The change in ethnicity from the actual firefighters, all of whom are white, proved controversial enough that the statue was never built.

On November 5, 2007, a  bronze monument based on the photograph called To Lift A Nation and depicting three New York firefighters raising the flag over the ruins of the World Trade Center was dedicated at the National Fallen Firefighters Memorial Park in Emmitsburg, Maryland.

From another angle
The picture taken by Thomas E. Franklin is not to be confused with another picture of the same event but from a different angle by Lori Grinker, a photographer from the photo agency Contact Press Images (who photographed the entire sequence), nor by Ricky Flores for The Journal News. Flores also was able to get near Ground Zero on the day of the attacks, and, at around the same time that Franklin took his shot, Flores was able to get into a second story of a nearby building and capture the same scene.

See also
 List of photographs considered the most important

References

External links 
 NorthJersey.com Official site of The Record (Bergen County, NJ) newspaper
 Ground Zero Spirit North Jersey Media Group 9/11 Disaster Relief Fund for 9/11. Includes photograph memorabilia and story of the photo.
 Icons: The Photo Seen 'Round the World Story of the photo

2001 works
Aftermath of the September 11 attacks
Flags of the United States
New York City Fire Department
Photographs of the United States
Postage stamps of the United States
Rockaway, Queens
Special events flags
Works originally published in American newspapers
World Trade Center
Flags in art
2000s photographs
Color photographs